Six Walks in the Fictional Woods is a non-fiction book by Umberto Eco. Originally delivered at Harvard for the Charles Eliot Norton Lectures in 1992 and 1993, the six lectures were published in the fall of 1994.

Overview
The book derives its title from Italo Calvino's Six Memos for the Next Millennium but Eco also cites Calvino's If On a Winter's Night a Traveler as inspiration because the novel "is concerned with the presence of the reader in the story", which was also the subject of the lectures and book.

Eco's general concerns, besides that of literary criticism, fall under the subjects of techniques of fiction and narration or rhetoric.

Table of contents
 "Entering the Woods"
 "The Woods of Loisy"
 "Lingering in the Woods"
 "Possible Woods"
 "The Strange Case of Rue Servandon"
 "Fictional Protocols"

External links
 Six Walks in the Fictional Woods, Harvard University Press,

See also
 Italo Calvino
 Protocols of the Elders of Zion

1994 essays
Books by Umberto Eco
Books of lectures
Books of literary criticism
Harvard University Press books
Italian essays